Pamela's Law is legislation that was passed in 2011 by the New Jersey Legislature and signed by Governor Chris Christie that bans the sale or possession of methylenedioxypyrovalerone (MDPV, most commonly found in the drug "bath salts").

History
It is named after Pamela Schmidt, a Rutgers University student who was murdered in March 2011. William Parisio, Jr., who was suspected of being under the influence of methylenedioxypyrovalerone was charged with her murder.

The prosecution announced on September 2, 2011, that the drug did not exist in Parisio's system at the time of his arrest on March 14, 2011.

See also
List of legislation named for a person

References

New Jersey statutes
2011 in American law
2011 in New Jersey